Cymatosirophycidae is a group of diatoms in the classe Coscinodiscophyceae.

References

External links

Eukaryote superorders
Coscinodiscophyceae
Monotypic SAR supergroup taxa